Jan Stehlík (born 18 April 1985) is a Czech handball player for Plzeň Handball and the Czech national team.

References

1985 births
Living people
Czech male handball players
Expatriate handball players
Czech expatriate sportspeople in France
Sportspeople from Plzeň